Oxford is a residential town located in western New Haven County, Connecticut, United States. The population was 12,706 at the 2020 Census. Oxford is the 26th-wealthiest town in the state by median household income. Distinct settled areas in the town include Oxford Center, Quaker Farms, and Riverside. Oxford belongs to the Bridgeport–Stamford–Norwalk Metropolitan Statistical Area, a subregion of the New York metropolitan area.

History
In the 18th century, farmers herded livestock through Oxford from as far away as Litchfield on the way to the port of New Haven. In the 19th century, the town lost population as farmers moved to work in better-paying factories.

Oxford was incorporated in October 1798. The town is named after Oxford, in England.

Geography

The towns bordering Oxford are Monroe, Newtown, Southbury, Middlebury, Naugatuck, Beacon Falls, Seymour and Shelton.

Demographics

As of the census of 2010, there were 12,683 people, 4,504 households, and 3,672 families residing in the town. Oxford's population increased 29.1% between 2000 and 2010, making it the fastest-growing municipality in Connecticut for that period. The racial makeup of the town was 95.5% White, 1.1% African American, 0.1% Native American, 1.5% Asian, 0.02% Pacific Islander, 0.6% some other race, and 1.1% from two or more races. Hispanic or Latino of any race were 3.7% of the population.

There were 4,504 households, out of which 34.9% had children under the age of 18 living with them, 71.4% were headed by married couples living together, 6.9% had a female householder with no husband present, and 18.5% were non-families. 14.2% of all households were made up of individuals, and 6.1% were someone living alone who was 65 years of age or older.  The average household size was 2.81, and the average family size was 3.12.

In the town, the population was spread out, with 24.3% under the age of 18, 5.8% from 18 to 24, 23.0% from 25 to 44, 33.4% from 45 to 64, and 13.5% who were 65 years of age or older.  The median age was 43.4 years. For every 100 females, there were 98.9 males.  For every 100 females age 18 and over, there were 97.9 males.

Oxford belongs to Connecticut's 4th congressional district, which stretches from lower Fairfield County to western New Haven County.

In 2016, the average income for a household in the town was $137,766, with a median income of $110,602. The median home value was $405,900.

Economy

A University of Connecticut development study spanning 1985–2006 showed that Oxford had the largest increase of development by percentage, growing 62% during that time. The median household income in town grew 20%, ranking Oxford the 26th wealthiest of 169 communities in the state.

Arts and culture
The Oxford Public Library was originally founded in 1883 and has moved several times, including to a new location in 2018.

Museums and other points of interest
 Quaker Farms Historic District
 Wooster Sawmill and Gristmill Site
 Twitchell-Rowland Homestead Center and Museum
The people of Oxford and the Oxford Historical Society were honored with a Connecticut Trust Preservation Award in 2012 for preservation efforts with respect to the Twitchell-Rowland Homestead.

Parks and recreation
Among the parks serving Oxford residents are Southford Falls State Park in the northern section of town, Jackson Cove Beach, and Kirks Pond in the center of town. The  Larkin State Park Trail, created in the 1940s from the path of a former train track, is one of the earliest examples of the "rails-to-trails" movement.

The Golf Club at Oxford Greens, a public golf course with over 400 homes for "active adults" over the age of 55, is located in town.

Education
Oxford has two elementary schools, one middle school, and a high school.
 Quaker Farms School: 550 students in grades K through 2; 
 Great Oak School (formerly Oxford Center School): 499 students in grades 3 through 5;
 Oxford Middle School (formerly Great Oak Middle School): 501 students in grades 6 through 8;
 Oxford High School: 554 students in grades 9 through 12.

Great Schools ranks Oxford Public Schools a 9 out of 10, or Excellent. In 2008, 90 percent of fourth grade students met state standards in math (as compared to 85 percent statewide); 82 percent in reading (statewide: 74 percent); 95 percent in writing (statewide: 85 percent). A total of 92 percent of eighth graders in town met state math standards (statewide: 85 percent), 94 percent in reading (statewide: 81 percent); and 94 percent in writing (statewide: 84 percent).

Oxford High School is a member of the Naugatuck Valley League, or NVL, for athletics.

Media
Local newspapers include:
 Connecticut Post of Bridgeport.
 Republican-American of Waterbury.
 New Haven Register of New Haven.
 Voices, a free publication distributed in over 20 towns in Fairfield, New Haven and Litchfield counties.

Local media broadcasting stations are:
 WTNH-New Haven
 WVIT-Hartford
 WFSB-Hartford

The local cable provider is Comcast of Western Connecticut, located in Seymour.

Infrastructure

Transportation

The town is bisected by Connecticut Route 67 that begins in Woodbridge and ends in New Milford. Route 188 runs through the Quaker Farms section of town. Other major roads in town are Route 34 along the Housatonic River (and which crosses the Housatonic into Monroe via the Stevenson Dam Bridge) and Route 42 in the eastern section of town.

Waterbury-Oxford Airport, with the second largest runway in Connecticut is located in Oxford and Middlebury. The airport, which is owned and operated by the Connecticut Department of Transportation, has become one of the largest and fastest growing corporate aviation centers in the Northeast. There are 252 aircraft based at the airport, with 80 of those aircraft being large corporate business jets.

Notable people 

 John Lyman Chatfield (18261863), U.S. Civil War colonel
 Barbara Hershey (born 1948), actress
 Orson Hyde (18051878), leader in the early Latter Day Saint movement and member of the first Quorum of the Twelve Apostles
 Kurt Kepshire (born 1959), former pitcher for the Saint Louis Cardinals
 Ottilie Pauline Wilke Lundgren (19072001), victim of the 2001 anthrax attacks
 Andrew Leete Stone (18151892), pastor, author, and Civil War chaplain
 Elliot M. Sutton (18411908), politician (mayor of Burlington, Vermont, member of the Vermont Senate)

Mysterious death 

In 2001, Oxford made international headlines when 94-year-old Oxford resident Ottilie Lundgren mysteriously died of anthrax. At the time, there was a spread of anthrax attacks in New York and Washington, and this case baffled law enforcement. No additional cases in the area suggested Lundgren's death was the result of accidental cross-contamination of the mail.

References

External links

 Town of Oxford official website
 Oxford Public Library
 Oxford Historical Society
 Oxford Public Schools

 
Towns in New Haven County, Connecticut
Naugatuck River Valley
Towns in the New York metropolitan area
Towns in Connecticut